The Shanghai–Jiaxing–Huzhou Expressway, commonly referred to as the Shenjiahu Expressway, is an expressway in the Chinese province of Zhejiang and city of Shanghai. In Shanghai, it is designated S32, and in Zhejiang, it is designated S12. It serves as an important connection between Pudong International Airport in Shanghai and the cities of Jiaxing and Huzhou in the province of Zhejiang.

References 

Expressways in Shanghai